Seymour Newman  (born 17 May 1953) is a Jamaican former athlete who competed in short and middle-distance running events

Biography
As a youth, Newman was a proficient cricketer and in the early 1970s he played for the Jamaica Under 19s team, in the same side as Jeff Dujon and Michael Holding.

Newman represented Jamaica in two events at the 1976 Summer Olympics. He made the semi-finals of the 800 metres and finished fifth in contentious circumstances, having been bumped during the race by US runner Rick Wohlhuter. The American was disqualified after the race but later reinstated, a decision which cost Newman a place in the final. He was also a member of the 4 × 400 metres relay team which made the final and finished in fifth position.

He won both the 400 metres and 800 metres races at the 1977 Central American and Caribbean Championships in Athletics. His run in the 400 metres final was in a field which included Cuba's Olympic champion Alberto Juantorena and set a personal best time, 45.66.

At the 1978 Commonwealth Games he won silver medals in the 800 metres and the 4 × 400 metres relay.

His personal best in the 800 metres, a time of 1:45.2 set in Helsinki in 1977, remains a Jamaican national record.

References

External links
Seymour Newman at Sports Reference

1953 births
Living people
Jamaican male sprinters
Jamaican male middle-distance runners
Olympic athletes of Jamaica
Athletes (track and field) at the 1976 Summer Olympics
Commonwealth Games silver medallists for Jamaica
Commonwealth Games medallists in athletics
Athletes (track and field) at the 1974 British Commonwealth Games
Athletes (track and field) at the 1978 Commonwealth Games
Competitors at the 1978 Central American and Caribbean Games
Central American and Caribbean Games bronze medalists for Jamaica
People from Manchester Parish
Central American and Caribbean Games medalists in athletics
20th-century Jamaican people
21st-century Jamaican people
Medallists at the 1978 Commonwealth Games